The 1903–04 St Helens R.F.C. season was the club's ninth in the Northern Rugby Football Union, the 30th in the club's history. After the previous year's relegation from the first division, St Helens were able to earn promotion at the first attempt, finishing second behind Wakefield Trinity in Division 2. St Helens also competed in the end-of-season South West Lancashire mini-league, in which they finished third. In the Challenge Cup, St Helens were beaten in the second round by Halifax.

NRFU Division 2

References

St Helens R.F.C. seasons
1903 in English rugby league
1904 in English rugby league